The Kings Arms was a public house in Woolwich in southeast London. Standing at 1 Frances Street to the south of Woolwich Dockyard and the Royal Marine Barracks, and northwest of the Royal Artillery Barracks, it was built in the 19th century. In the 1881 census it is listed as the Kings Arms Hotel.

The pub was bombed by the IRA in 1974, killing two people. The pub was demolished for redevelopment in 2020.

Woolwich pub bombing
The pub was bombed by the Provisional Irish Republican Army in 1974, with two deaths.

Redevelopment

On 3 April 2017, a London-based real estate development company, P2P Residential Limited acquired the site for £1.2m. On 17 April 2018, the company obtained full planning permission to demolish the pub and redevelop it as 19 residential units, nine parking spaces and a replacement pub across the ground floor and basement.

Similar plans had been proposed in 2013; permission was granted in 2015 for 12 residential units and a pub, but the then owner did not implement the consent.

References

Woolwich
Pubs in the Royal Borough of Greenwich
History of the Royal Borough of Greenwich
Former pubs in London
Demolished buildings and structures in London
Buildings and structures demolished in 2020